Artyom Yevgenyevich Makarchuk (born 9 November 1995) is a Russian football player who plays for PFC Sochi and the Russia national team.

Club career
He made his professional debut in the Russian Football National League for FC Baltika Kaliningrad on 11 July 2015 in a game against FC Shinnik Yaroslavl.

On 8 February 2022, Makarchuk joined Russian Premier League club PFC Sochi. He made his RPL debut for Sochi on 7 March 2022 against FC Rostov.

International career
Makarchuk was called up to the Russia national football team for the first time for a friendly against Kyrgyzstan in September 2022. He made his debut on 24 September 2022 in that game.

Career statistics

Club

International

References

External links
 
 
 Player page on the FNL website

1995 births
People from Svetly
Sportspeople from Kaliningrad Oblast
Living people
Russian footballers
Russia international footballers
Association football midfielders
FC Baltika Kaliningrad players
FC Luch Vladivostok players
FC Fakel Voronezh players
PFC Sochi players
Russian First League players
Russian Premier League players
Russian people of Ukrainian descent